First Watch may refer to:

 First Watch (album), a Christian rock album by Guardian
 First Watch (restaurant chain), breakfast, brunch and lunch cafes
 The "first watch" work duty, a traditional watch system